Kristiansund stadion, until 2014 known as Gressbanen is a football stadium located at Karihola in Kristiansund, Norway, and is the home of both Norwegian Eliteserien club Kristiansund Ballklubb and 4. divisjon (fifth tier) club Kristiansund Fotballklubb. The stadium has a current capacity of 4,444 spectators.

History 
Kristiansund Stadion was opened 17 September 1950, in a match between Kristiansund FK and Ørn-Horten. Kristiansund FK lost the game 2–3. The attendance on the opening game, 6,200, is still the record attendance at Kristiansund Stadion. Since the stadium has been home to Kristiansund Fotballklubb, the stadium was called "KFK-banen" ("The KFK pitch).

Attendances
This shows the average attendance on Kristiansund BK's home games since 2014, their first season at the renovated Kristiansund Stadion.

References

External links
 Kristiansund Stadion at kristiansundbk.com
 Kristiansund Stadion - Nordic Stadiums

Kristiansund BK
Football venues in Norway
Eliteserien venues
Sports venues in Kristiansund
Sports venues completed in 1950
1950 establishments in Norway